My Passport is a series of portable external hard drives and solid state drives produced by Western Digital. There are currently six series of My Passport drives; Essential Edition, Essential SE Edition, Elite Edition, Essential for Mac, Studio Edition and the Essential SE for Mac.

My Passport drives are designed to look like and be the size of a passport, none of the drives in the passport series require a power socket although the "elite editions" feature a docking system.

Standard Editions

Essential Edition 
Essential Editions include USB 2.0 though new models also include USB 3.0 ports, the white LED Indicator.

Essential SE Edition 
Essential SE Editions have both USB 2.0 and USB 3.0 ports and come in 750 GB and 1 TB variations; the Essential SE Edition has the same physical appearance as the Essential Edition.

Elite Edition 
Elite Editions have a USB 2.0 port and come in 320 GB (298 GiB), 500 GB (466 GiB)and 640 GB (596 GiB) variations. Elite Editions include a desktop dock and have a LED capacity gauge on the front and a lock indicator.
This edition comes in red, blue and black.

Mac Editions

Essential Edition 
The Essential Edition for MacBook Pro and Air has a USB 2.0 port and a capacity of 320 GB (298 GiB) and is available in gloss black. It has the same design as the Essential Edition.

Essential SE Edition 
The Essential SE Edition for Mac has a USB 2.0 port and a capacity of 1 TB and comes in silver. It has the same design as the Essential Edition.

Studio Edition 
The Studio Edition has FireWire 400, FireWire 800 and USB 2.0 ports and a capacity of 320 GB (298 GiB) and 640 GB (596 GiB). The Studio Edition has a capacity gauge on the top side and has a silver appearance.

Console Editions

My Passport X Edition 
The My Passport X editions include a USB 3.0 port and come in 1TB and 2TB variations. This specific edition has been marketed as a hard drive designed to extend the storage capacity of consoles such as the Xbox and Playstation.

References 

Hard disk drives
Western Digital products